Five-stroke method may refer to the following Chinese input methods:

 Stroke count method (五笔画输入法)
 Wubi method (五笔字型输入法)